Alışık is a Turkish surname. Notable people with the surname include:

Kerem Alışık (born 1960), Turkish actor and television presenter
Sadri Alışık (1925–1995), Turkish actor

Turkish-language surnames